Maitland River is in Ontario, Canada.

Maitland River may also refer to:

Maitland River (Western Australia), in the Pilbara region

See also 
 Maitland (disambiguation)